The Pre-Hospital Emergency Care Council (PHECC) is an independent statutory organisation responsible for implementing, monitoring and further developing the standards of care provided by all statutory, private and voluntary ambulance services in Ireland. It is also responsible for conducting examinations at six levels of pre-hospital care, the control of ambulance practitioner registration and the publication of clinical practice guidelines.

Levels of Care 
There are six skill levels obtainable. They are divided into responder and practitioner categories. As of September 2019, all practitioners working on an emergency ambulance must be trained to a minimum of paramedic, however in 2021 this minimum requirement was temporarily waived allowing an EMT to crew with a paramedic or advanced paramedic for the remainder of the COVID-19 era. A practitioner working on a non-emergency transport or intermediate care vehicle must be at least an emergency medical technician.

Responders 

Responder training is aimed towards workplace response, Gardaí, fire service personnel, military personnel, voluntary first aid organisations, sports clubs and security services.
Voluntary first aid services such as Civil Defence, Order of Malta Ambulance Corps, Irish Red Cross and the St John Ambulance Brigade of Ireland avail of responder training to allow their members provide on-site first aid at the various events they cover.
Certain remote communities have set up their own individual Cardiac First Response programmes, where various people in the area are trained to PHECC Level 1 (CFR) standard and are provided with an Automated External Defibrillator. These responders can then be called or paged to the scene of a cardiac arrest to provide CPR and defibrillation, where the increased response time of an ambulance would greatly affect the patient's outcome.

Practitioners 
Practitioners must maintain their place on the register annually in order to practice. Once registered, practitioners are governed by a code of conduct, care principles, regulations and various laws, (primarily tort law) when engaging with the public. As a result, practitioners are subject to professional accountability in terms of their professional practice and actions. Upon qualification and registration, a practitioner is issued with an identification number and licence card. The practitioner's PIN must be entered on all patient care records for any incident where the practitioner had contact with a patient. It is the responsibility of the licence holder to maintain an ongoing, predetermined standard of competency.

CPG Approved Service Providers 
All organisations and companies who are providing an ambulance service in any capacity must register with PHECC as a CPG Approved Service Provider to work to the current edition of Clinical Practice Guidelines published by PHECC. Approved Service Providers are broken down into four categories. 3rd Edition CPG Providers are the Irish Defence Forces and Event Medical Services Ltd. 3rd Edition CPG Providers are listed on the PHECC website and updated regularly.

Citizen CPR campaign 
In 2010, PHECC launched a poster-advertising and television-ad campaign aimed at informing the general public of what to do if they should witness an adult suddenly collapse. Its focus was to emphasise the fact that CPR can still be effective without mouth-to-mouth contact. Pocket-sized cards were distributed with instructions on the steps to take:

 Check: check if the person is unresponsive and not breathing.
 Call: Get someone to call 999 or 112 or call them yourself.
 Compress: Push hard and fast in the centre of the chest. Don't stop until help arrives.

Red Card 

The Red Card has been developed by PHECC to help responders prepare prior to calling an ambulance. The card will prompt appropriate information from the Garda Síochána and Fire Service personnel on-scene who require an emergency ambulance to attend.

See also 
 Health Service Executive
 HSE National Ambulance Service
 Dublin Fire Brigade
 Civil Defence Ireland
 Order of Malta Ambulance Corps
 The St. John Ambulance Brigade of Ireland
 Irish Red Cross

References

External links 
 PHECC Citizen CPR Website

Ambulance services in Ireland
Medical and health organisations based in the Republic of Ireland